Alessandro Zamperini (born 15 August 1982) is an Italian footballer, in the role of defender.

Club career
Alessandro Zamperini started his footballing career at Serie A giants Lazio, the club he has supported as a child, before signing his first professional contract, at fierce rivals Roma, then moving to English First Division club Portsmouth appearing for them 26 times and scoring 2 goals against Gillingham and Crystal Palace. Zamperini then moved back to Italy with Serie A team Modena, though he did not make an appearance for them. He then had spells with several Serie C1 clubs, including Acireale, Sambenedettese and Ternana Serie B before moving to side Cisco Roma in 2007, and Valle del Giovenco in 2008.

In 2009, he moved abroad again, joined Latvian champions FK Ventspils, and also scoring a goal in the 2009–10 UEFA Europa League in a surprising 1–1 away draw against Sporting Clube de Portugal.

On 2 August 2013 Zamperini was suspended for 2 years due to 2011 match-fixing scandal.

References

External links

 
 

1982 births
Living people
Footballers from Rome
Italian footballers
Portsmouth F.C. players
A.S. Sambenedettese players
Ternana Calcio players
Italian expatriate sportspeople in Latvia
FK Ventspils players
Expatriate footballers in Latvia
West Ham United F.C. players
Modena F.C. players
Expatriate footballers in England
Association football defenders